Pseudocamelina is a genus of flowering plants belonging to the family Brassicaceae.

Its native range is Iraq to Iran, Western Himalaya.

Species:

Pseudocamelina aphragmodes 
Pseudocamelina bakhtiarica 
Pseudocamelina campylocarpa 
Pseudocamelina campylopoda 
Pseudocamelina conwayi 
Pseudocamelina glaucophylla 
Pseudocamelina kermanica 
Pseudocamelina kleinii 
Pseudocamelina kurdica

References

Brassicaceae
Brassicaceae genera